Rousselot is a French surname. Notable people with the surname include:

Jacques Rousselot (born 1949), French businessman
Jean-Pierre Rousselot (1846–1924), French theologian
John H. Rousselot (1927–2003), American journalist
Juan Carlos Rousselot (1935–2010), Argentine radio and television personality
Philippe Rousselot (born 1945), French cinematographer
Pierre Rousselot (1878–1915), French Jesuit

French-language surnames